Batzal Yarok (Hebrew: בצל ירוק (lit. Green Onion) was an Israeli theatre and entertainment troupe founded in 1957 by ex-members of the IDF army ensemble, Lahakat Hanahal.

History
Among those who wrote songs for the group was Sasha Argov. It was one of the most well-known entertainment troupes in Israel in the late 1950s and early 1960s. One of the founding members of Batzal Yarok was Uri Zohar.Chaim Topol performed with the group from 1960 to 1964. Ephraim Kishon wrote several satirical skits for Batzak Yarok.Naomi Shemer wrote the texts for the first performance of Batzal Yarok in 1957. Her song Zamar Noded (Wandering Troubadour) was also written for the troupe.

Shows
 Shmor Al HaGvul (Guard the Border) - This show was produced by the founders of the troupe before the end of their military service
 1957: Kvisat HaRash (The Poor Man's Laundry) - A pun with the Hebrew words Kvisa (Laundry) and Kivsa (Sheep), referencing the biblical parable employed by  Nathan the Prophet to condemn the relationship between David and Bathsheba.
 1958: Hop Avarnu (Hop! We Moved)
 1959: Af Mila LeMorgenstein (Not a Word to Morgenstein) - This show became the basis for a movie with the same name, filmed in 1963.
 1959: Ve... Shalosh Nekudot! (And ... Three Points!)
 1960: Chatul BaSak (Cat in the Sack).

Troupe members
 Uri Zohar - Vocals, direction
 Ilana Rovina - Vocals
 Yona Atari - Vocals
 Shimon Israeli - Vocals
 Nechama Hendel - Vocals
 Zaharira Harifai - Vocals 
 Gabi Amrani - Vocals
 Yosef Oreg - Accordion
 Chaim Topol and Galya Topol - Vocals
 Eliahu Barkai - Vocals
 Oded Kotler - Vocals
 Ruti Atias - Vocals
 Avraham Mor - Took part only in the first show.
 Nira Adi
 Aliza Kashi
 Arik Einstein
 Shai Danon
 Martin Brecher - Trumpet
 David Elshayach - Drums and percussion
 Shmuel Bonim

See also
Music of Israel

References

Musical groups established in 1957
Musical groups disestablished in 1961
Israeli musical groups